This is a list of museums in Yangon, Myanmar.

Bogyoke Aung San Museum
Myanmar Gems Museum
Myanmar Motion Picture Museum
 National Museum of Myanmar
Planetarium (Burma)
Yangon Drugs Elimination Museum

See also
List of museums in Burma

Yangon
 
Lists of buildings and structures in Myanmar
Yangon-related lists